Burg is a manor-house underneath the castle Považský hrad, on the south. Order to build the manor was given by Simon Balassa. Building works on the manor started in the first third of the 17th century and were finished 1631, when family moved from Castle. Last owner was baroness Popper, who supported reconstruction of the manor until after the World War I in 1919 it became possession of the state. Later it was bought by private company PARTNER PROGRESS, s.r.o.
A gothic header joist was moved here from the castle.

Gallery

Present situation

External links
Info  
Short history of both manor houses under the castle in slovak 
page about the owner of the manor in slovak 

Buildings and structures in Trenčín Region
Houses in Slovakia